About Us is a 2016 Costa Rican romantic comedy-drama film written and directed by Hernán Jiménez, who also stars with Noelia Castaño and Marina Glezer. It was selected as the Costa Rican entry for the Best Foreign Language Film at the 89th Academy Awards but it was not nominated.

Cast
 Hernán Jiménez as Diego
 Noelia Castaño as Sofia
 Marina Glezer as Malena

See also
 List of submissions to the 89th Academy Awards for Best Foreign Language Film
 List of Costa Rican submissions for the Academy Award for Best Foreign Language Film

References

External links
 

2016 films
2016 romantic comedy-drama films
2010s Spanish-language films
Costa Rican comedy-drama films
Films directed by Hernán Jiménez
Films scored by Mark Orton